Gaston Orbal (1898–1983) was a French stage and film actor.

Selected filmography
 Tricoche and Cacolet (1938)
 Tobias Is an Angel (1940)
 A Woman in the Night (1943)
 Dorothy Looks for Love (1945)
 Box of Dreams (1945)
 The Heroic Monsieur Boniface (1949)
 I Like Only You (1949)
 Casimir (1950)
 The Chocolate Girl (1950)
 Le Dindon (1951)
 La Fugue de Monsieur Perle (1952)
 A Hundred Francs a Second (1953)
 Au diable la vertu (1954)
 Ali Baba and the Forty Thieves (1954)
 House on the Waterfront (1955)
 Four Days in Paris (1955)
 La Bande à papa (1956)
 Love in Jamaica (1957)

References

Bibliography
 Jacques Lorcey. Bourvil. PAC, 1981.

External links

1898 births
1983 deaths
French male film actors
French male stage actors
Actors from Montpellier